These species belong to Synopeas, a genus of parasitoid wasps in the family Platygastridae.

Synopeas species

 Synopeas abaris (Walker, 1836)
 Synopeas abdominator (Fouts, 1925)
 Synopeas aciculatum (Fouts, 1924)
 Synopeas acuminatum Kieffer, 1916
 Synopeas acuticornis Buhl, 2003
 Synopeas acutispinus Buhl, 1998
 Synopeas acutiventris Buhl, 1997
 Synopeas affine (Nees von Esenbeck, 1834)
 Synopeas affinis (Nees, 1834)
 Synopeas africanus Buhl, 2004
 Synopeas alatus Buhl, 2004
 Synopeas amandae Awad, 2021
 Synopeas anderssoni Buhl, 2013
 Synopeas angustulum (Fouts, 1925)
 Synopeas anomaliventre (Ashmead, 1887)
 Synopeas anunu Awad, 2021
 Synopeas argentinensis Buhl, 2004
 Synopeas ashmeadii Dalla Torre, 1898
 Synopeas athenaeum (Walker, 1839)
 Synopeas atturense Mukerjee, 1981
 Synopeas auripes (Ashmead, 1893)
 Synopeas autumnalis Buhl, 1998
 Synopeas balabacensis Buhl, 1997
 Synopeas bengalense Mukerjee, 1978
 Synopeas bialowiezaensis Buhl, 2005
 Synopeas bicolor Sundholm, 1970
 Synopeas bifoveatum (Kieffer, 1912)
 Synopeas bifurcatus Buhl, 2001
 Synopeas blascoi Buhl, 1998
 Synopeas bohemani Buhl, 1998
 Synopeas bradleyi (Fouts, 1924)
 Synopeas breve Buhl, 1998
 Synopeas brevis Buhl, 1998
 Synopeas breviventre (Ashmead, 1893)
 Synopeas butterilli Buhl, 2013
 Synopeas carinator (Fouts, 1925)
 Synopeas carinifrons Buhl, 2001
 Synopeas carpentieri Kieffer, 1916
 Synopeas chica Buhl, 2004
 Synopeas chinensis Buhl, 2007
 Synopeas ciliatum Thomson, 1859
 Synopeas codex Awad, 2021
 Synopeas collinus Choi & Buhl, 2006
 Synopeas compressiventris (Szabó, 1981)
 Synopeas congoanum (Risbec, 1958)
 Synopeas convexum Thomson, 1859
 Synopeas crassiceps Buhl, 1997
 Synopeas craterum (Walker, 1836)
 Synopeas cryptus Buhl, 2004
 Synopeas csoszi Buhl, 2004
 Synopeas curvicauda (Förster, 1856)
 Synopeas cynipsiphilum (Ashmead, 1887)
 Synopeas cynipsoides Buhl, 2004
 Synopeas daucicola Kieffer, 1916
 Synopeas decumbens Buhl, 1997
 Synopeas decurvatum (Nees von Esenbeck, 1834)
 Synopeas dentiscutellaris (Szabó, 1979)
 Synopeas dentiscutum (Szabó, 1981)
 Synopeas discoideus Buhl, 2005
 Synopeas doczkali Buhl, 2010
 Synopeas donizettii Vlug, 1995
 Synopeas dravedensis Buhl, 2004
 Synopeas dubiosum (Fouts, 1925)
 Synopeas epigeios Buhl, 2006
 Synopeas esenbecki Buhl, 1999
 Synopeas eugeniae Kieffer & Herbst, 1911
 Synopeas euryale (Walker, 1836)
 Synopeas figitiformis Thomson, 1859
 Synopeas flavicorne (Ashmead, 1893)
 Synopeas flavipes Ashmead, 1896
 Synopeas floridanum (Ashmead, 1893)
 Synopeas fluminale Yamagishi, 1980
 Synopeas fontali Buhl, 2002
 Synopeas forshagei Buhl, 2006
 Synopeas foutsi Masner, 1967
 Synopeas frontale Buhl, 2010
 Synopeas frontalis Buhl, 1998
 Synopeas fulvimanus Buhl, 2004
 Synopeas fungorum Buhl, 2000
 Synopeas fuscicola Box, 1921
 Synopeas fuscus Buhl, 1998
 Synopeas gallicola Kieffer, 1916
 Synopeas gastralis Buhl, 2001
 Synopeas gibberosus Buhl, 1997
 Synopeas globatum (Fouts, 1924)
 Synopeas goengeti Buhl, 1997
 Synopeas gracilicorne Kieffer, 1916
 Synopeas gracilicornis Kieffer, 1916
 Synopeas grenadense (Ashmead, 1896)
 Synopeas guatemalae Buhl, 2003
 Synopeas hakonense (Ashmead, 1904)
 Synopeas haladai Buhl, 2007
 Synopeas hansseni Buhl, 1998
 Synopeas hastatus Buhl, 2002
 Synopeas hopkinsi (Crawford & Bradley, 1911)
 Synopeas howardii (Ashmead, 1888)
 Synopeas hyllus (Walker, 1836)
 Synopeas ibadanensis Buhl, 2004
 Synopeas idarniforme (Dodd, 1916)
 Synopeas ilsei Vlug, 1995
 Synopeas incertum (Ashmead, 1887)
 Synopeas indicum Mani, 1975
 Synopeas indopeninsulare Mani, 1975
 Synopeas inerme Thomson, 1859
 Synopeas inermis Thomson, 1859
 Synopeas inquilinum Kieffer, 1904
 Synopeas insulare (Ashmead, 1894)
 Synopeas intermedius Buhl, 2003
 Synopeas involutum Kieffer, 1916
 Synopeas isus (Walker, 1839)
 Synopeas iteobia Kieffer, 1916
 Synopeas japonicum (Ashmead, 1904)
 Synopeas jasium (Walker, 1836)
 Synopeas johansoni Buhl, 2015
 Synopeas kalubia Awad, 2021
 Synopeas kanwonensis Buhl, 2006
 Synopeas kaszabi Buhl, 2004
 Synopeas kiki Awad, 2021
 Synopeas kimi Choi & Buhl, 2006
 Synopeas kira Awad, 2021
 Synopeas klingunculum Awad, 2021
 Synopeas koponeni Buhl, 2003
 Synopeas koreana Buhl, 2006
 Synopeas kovacsi Buhl, 2004
 Synopeas larides (Walker, 1836)
 Synopeas leda (Walker, 1839)
 Synopeas lemkaminensis Buhl, 1997
 Synopeas leroyi (Risbec, 1958)
 Synopeas leve Fouts, 1935
 Synopeas levis Fouts, 1934
 Synopeas longifuniculus Buhl, 2002
 Synopeas longiventre (Ashmead, 1893)
 Synopeas lugubre Thomson, 1859
 Synopeas lugubris Thomson, 1859
 Synopeas luli Awad, 2021
 Synopeas luteolipes Buhl, 1997
 Synopeas luzonicum (Ashmead, 1905)
 Synopeas macrurus (Ashmead, 1896)
 Synopeas maculipes (Ashmead, 1887)
 Synopeas madagascariense (Risbec, 1953)
 Synopeas madridiana Buhl, 2001
 Synopeas magnussoni Buhl, 2010
 Synopeas mahunkai Buhl, 2006
 Synopeas mangiferae Austin, 1984
 Synopeas marttii Buhl, 2004
 Synopeas mazumbaiense Buhl & MS, 2008
 Synopeas melampus Förster, 1861
 Synopeas meridionalis Brues, 1922
 Synopeas millefolii (Kieffer, 1913)
 Synopeas minor (Brues, 1922)
 Synopeas mongolicus Buhl, 2004
 Synopeas montanus Buhl, 1997
 Synopeas monticola (Kieffer, 1910)
 Synopeas mucronatum (Ratzeburg, 1852)
 Synopeas mukerjeei Buhl, 1997
 Synopeas muticum (Nees von Esenbeck, 1834)
 Synopeas myles (Walker, 1836)
 Synopeas neglectus Buhl, 2004
 Synopeas nepalense Mukerjee, 1981
 Synopeas nervicola Kieffer, 1916
 Synopeas nervorum Kieffer, 1916
 Synopeas neurolasiopterae Brèthes, 1922
 Synopeas neuroteri Kieffer, 1916
 Synopeas nievesaldreyi Buhl, 2002
 Synopeas nigeriana Buhl, 2004
 Synopeas nigerrimum Sundholm, 1970
 Synopeas nigripes Ashmead, 1893
 Synopeas nigriscapis Förster, 1861
 Synopeas nigroides Buhl, 2001
 Synopeas nottoni Buhl, 2009
 Synopeas noyesi Buhl, 2009
 Synopeas obesus Buhl, 2001
 Synopeas occultum Awad, 2021
 Synopeas opacum Thomson, 1859
 Synopeas osaces (Walker, 1836)
 Synopeas osgoodi MacGown, 1974
 Synopeas otiosum Kieffer, 1924
 Synopeas palawanensis Buhl, 1997
 Synopeas pallescens Buhl, 1997
 Synopeas pallidicornis Buhl, 2006
 Synopeas panamaensis Buhl, 2002
 Synopeas paolii Fouts, 1934
 Synopeas pattiae Awad, 2021
 Synopeas pauliani (Risbec, 1957)
 Synopeas pennsylvanicum (Fouts, 1924)
 Synopeas pinnei Buhl, 2009
 Synopeas pisi (Förster, 1856)
 Synopeas planiscutellum Buhl, 1997
 Synopeas pleuralis Buhl, 2004
 Synopeas polaszeki Buhl, 2004
 Synopeas procerus Buhl, 2005
 Synopeas procon Austin, 1984
 Synopeas prospectum Förster, 1861
 Synopeas psychotriae Buhl, 2013
 Synopeas pterocarpi Buhl, 2013
 Synopeas pubescens (Ashmead, 1893)
 Synopeas pulupulu Awad, 2021
 Synopeas pumilus Buhl & Choi, 2006
 Synopeas punctatum (Ashmead, 1893)
 Synopeas punctigaster (Szabó, 1981)
 Synopeas queenslandicus Buhl, 2004
 Synopeas raphanistri Kieffer, 1916
 Synopeas rectum (Ratzeburg, 1852)
 Synopeas recurvatus Buhl, 2003
 Synopeas reticulatifrons Buhl, 2002
 Synopeas reticulatum (Szabó, 1966)
 Synopeas rhane (Walker, 1836)
 Synopeas rhanis (Walker, 1836)
 Synopeas rigidicornis Förster, 1861
 Synopeas rionegroensis Buhl, 2004
 Synopeas robustus Buhl, 2004
 Synopeas romsoeense Buhl, 1999
 Synopeas romsoeensis Buhl, 1999
 Synopeas roncavei Awad, 2021
 Synopeas ronquisti Buhl, 2010
 Synopeas royi Buhl, 2001
 Synopeas ruficoxa Buhl, 2006
 Synopeas rufipes (Ashmead, 1894)
 Synopeas rufiscapus Ashmead, 1893
 Synopeas rugiceps Ashmead
 Synopeas rugosiceps (Kieffer, 1926)
 Synopeas russelli MacGown, 2003
 Synopeas saccharale (Dodd, 1916)
 Synopeas saintexuperyi Buhl, 1997
 Synopeas salice Szelényi, 1940
 Synopeas salicicola (Kieffer, 1916)
 Synopeas salicis Szelenyi, 1940
 Synopeas sanga Awad, 2021
 Synopeas saopaulensis Buhl, 2004
 Synopeas sculpturatum Buhl, 1997
 Synopeas seychellense (Kieffer, 1912)
 Synopeas soederlundi Buhl, 2005
 Synopeas solidus Buhl, 2001
 Synopeas solomonensis Buhl, 1997
 Synopeas sose (Walker, 1836)
 Synopeas sosis (Walker, 1836)
 Synopeas spinifer Kozlov, 1978
 Synopeas spiniferum Kozlov, 1978
 Synopeas spinulus Buhl, 2004
 Synopeas srilankensis Buhl, 2003
 Synopeas stigenbergae Buhl, 2013
 Synopeas striatifrons (Ashmead, 1893)
 Synopeas striatitergitis Buhl, 2004
 Synopeas striatum (Risbec, 1958)
 Synopeas subaequale (Förster, 1856)
 Synopeas subaequalis (Foerster, 1856)
 Synopeas substrigosus Buhl, 2006
 Synopeas subtilis Buhl, 2004
 Synopeas sundholmi Buhl, 2005
 Synopeas suomiana Buhl, 2003
 Synopeas talhouki Vlug, 1976
 Synopeas tarsa (Walker, 1836)
 Synopeas temporale Austin, 1984
 Synopeas texanum (Fouts, 1925)
 Synopeas thersippus (Walker, 1839)
 Synopeas thorkildi Buhl, 2004
 Synopeas thysanus Kozlov, 1978
 Synopeas tosticola Kozlov
 Synopeas toto Awad, 2021
 Synopeas trebium (Walker, 1836)
 Synopeas tripartitum (Kieffer, 1917)
 Synopeas tropicus Buhl, 1997
 Synopeas tuberosum Sundholm, 1970
 Synopeas valavala Awad, 2021
 Synopeas varipes (Harrington, 1900)
 Synopeas velutinum (Walker, 1836)
 Synopeas ventrale (Westwood, 1833)
 Synopeas ventricosus Buhl, 1997
 Synopeas vulgaris Buhl, 2004
 Synopeas wangsjoi Buhl, 2009
 Synopeas wasmanni Kieffer, 1916
 Synopeas weaveri Buhl, 2001
 Synopeas xanthopus Kieffer, 1913
 Synopeas xenarchus (Walker, 1839)
 Synopeas yanagi Yamagishi, 1980
 Synopeas zaitama Yoshida & Hirashima, 1979
 Synopeas zhangi Awad, 2021
 Synopeas zomborii Buhl, 2004

References

Synopeas